Gerashchenkovo is a rural locality (a settlement) in Alexeyevsky District, Belgorod Oblast, Russia. The population was 108 as of 2010. There is 1 street.

Geography 
Gerashchenkovo is located 50 km southeast of Alexeyevka (the district's administrative centre) by road. Khmyzovka is the nearest rural locality.

References 

Rural localities in Alexeyevsky District, Belgorod Oblast
Biryuchensky Uyezd